Paolo Silvio Boccone (24 April 1633 – 22 December 1704) was an Italian botanist from Sicily, whose interest in plants had been sparked at a young age. Born in a rich family, he was able to dedicate most of his life to the study of botany.

Life
Born in Palermo, he often visited the botanical garden (l'Orto Botanico) founded in Messina by the Roman doctor Pietro Castelli, who became his instructor. He traveled across Sicily, to Corsica, Paris, and London and took a doctor's degree in Padua. He published Recherches et observations naturelles (Paris, 1671; illustrated and greatly enlarged edition Amsterdam, 1674), which concerned itself with various theories of nature, and supplied important contributions to the fields of palaeontology, medicine and toxicology.

He was employed as court botanist to Ferdinando II de' Medici, Grand Duke of Tuscany as well as to Ferdinando's son, Cosimo III.

In the work Museo di piante rare della Sicilia, Malta, Corsica, Italia, Piemonte, e Germania (1697), Boccone described many rare plants of Sicily, Malta, Italy, Piedmont, and Germany.  A fungus scientifically named Pisolithus tinctorius was called in the Sicilian language catatùnfuli, and Boccone writes that this fungus was employed by the women of Messina in order to dye cloth.

In 1682, Boccone entered the order of the Cistercians and took the name Silvio. After this conversion, Boccone is said to have dropped his avid study of botany, though he continued his travels.

Boccone had been widely regarded by the scientific community, and was in contact with many European naturalists. The French botanist Charles Plumier studied under him at Rome.

Boccone died in Altofonte in the monastery of Santa Maria di Altofonte, not far from Palermo.

Plumier named the genus Bocconia, in the family of the Papaveraceae, after him, a name that was later adopted by Linnaeus.

Works

This list was retrieved from Bibliothèque interuniversitaire de santé, Paris:
Recherches & observations touchant le corail, la pierre étoilée, les pierres de figure de coquilles, etc...., Amsterdam, 1674.
Recherches et observations naturelles. Amsterdam: Chez Jean Jansson, 1674.
Icones et descriptiones rariorum plantarum Siciliae, Melitae, Galliae et Italiae... auctore Paulo Boccone,... (Edidit R. Morison.), Oxford, e theatro Sheldoniano, 1674. In-4 ?, XVI-96 p., fig. (dedicated to Charles Hatton)
Icones et descriptiones rariorum plantarum Siciliae, Melitae, Galliae et Italiae... auctore Paulo Boccone,...cum praefatione Roberti Mossiockii, Lugduni, apud Robertum Scott, 1674.
Novitiato ala segreteria del signore Paolo Boccone, gentiluomo di Palermo, lettura grata non meno a principi che a loro segretari, per mostrare con faciltà e brevità l'arte d'un accorto secretario, Genuae, apud haeredes Calenziani, sd. In-12°.
Osservazioni naturali, ove si contengono materie medico-fisiche, e di botanica, produzioni naturali fossofori diversi, fuochi sotterranei d'Itali e altre curiosità, disposte en trattati familiari, Bononiae, apud Monolessos, 1684. In-12°.
Lettre de Monsieur Boccone,... écrite à Mr. l'Abbé Bourdelot,... touchant l'embrasement du mont Etna, S. l. n. d. In-12, paginé 67–78, carte.
 
Della pietra Belzuar minerale siciliana lettera familiare, Monteleoni, apud Dominicum Ferrum, 1669.
Museo di piante rare della Sicilia, Malta, Corsica, italia, Piemonte e Germania con figure 133 in rame, Venetiis, apud Ioannem Baptistam Zuccarum, 1697.
Epistola botanica
Recherches et observations naturelles touchant le corail, pierre estoilee, embrasement du mont Etna, Parisiis, apud Baloin ad Palatum, 1672.
Museum experimentale-physicum, complectens observationes eruditis et curiosis, Francofurti, apuc Michaelem Rohrbach, 1697. In-12°.

Named after Boccone
The genus Bocconia L.

Among others, the following species:
Achillea bocconii W.D.J.Koch (Achillea, Asteraceae)
Alsine bocconi Scheele - former name of syn. Spergularia bocconei (Scheele) Graebn. (Spergularia (Pers.), Caryophyllaceae) [Formerly (Alsine, now an obsolete genus, Caryophyllaceae)]
Chiliadenus bocconei Brullo (= Jasonia bocconei (Brullo) M.Pardo & R.Morales) (Chiliadenus, Jasonia, Asteraceae)
Eryngium bocconi Lam. (Eryngium, Apiaceae)
Euphrasia bocconi Guss. (= Odontites bocconei (Guss.) Walp.) (Euphrasia, Odontites, Scrophulariaceae)
Heliotropium bocconi Guss. (Heliotropium, Boraginaceae)
Helleborus bocconei Ten. (Helleborus, Ranunculaceae)
Jurinea bocconi Guss. (Jurinea, Asteraceae)
 Seseli bocconi Guss. (Seseli, Apiaceae)
  Spergularia bocconei (Scheele) Graebn. (Spergularia (Pers.), Caryophyllaceae). Formerly Alsine bocconi (Alsine, now an obsolete genus, Caryophyllaceae)
Tanacetum bocconii Sch.Bip. (Tanacetum, Asteraceae)

See also
List of Roman Catholic scientist-clerics

References

External links

 L'herbier de Paolo Boccone
 Museo di fisica e di esperienze variato e decorato di osservazioni naturali, note medicinali...
Boccone, Paolo (1674) Recherches et observations naturelles - digital facsimile from the Linda Hall Library

1633 births
1704 deaths
Italian Cistercians
17th-century Italian botanists
Scientists from Palermo
Catholic clergy scientists
Pre-Linnaean botanists